The Masonic Temple in Great Falls, Montana is a building from 1914. It was listed on the National Register of Historic Places in 2000.

Address is 821 Central Avenue, Great Falls, Montana 59401, Phone number is 453-9080.

Cascade No. 34 meets 2nd and 4th Tuesdays at 7:30pm, Sept-June.

Euclid No. 58 meets year-round, 1st and 3rd Tuesdays at 7:30pm, Sept-May, 3rd Tuesdays at 7:30pm, June-Aug.

Delta No. 128 meets 2nd Wednesdays at 7:30pm, Sept-June.

The Great Falls York Rite Bodies and Hassan Grotto MOVPER also meet in this building.

There is a coffee and donuts every Saturday at 9:00 AM in the basement for men interested in learning more about Freemasonry.

Three active Blue Lodges meet in the building throughout the year including: Cascade Lodge No. 34, Euclid Lodge No. 58, and Delta Lodge No. 128.

References

Clubhouses on the National Register of Historic Places in Montana
Masonic buildings completed in 1914
Buildings and structures in Great Falls, Montana
Masonic buildings in Montana
National Register of Historic Places in Cascade County, Montana
Tudor Revival architecture in Montana
1914 establishments in Montana